Måvatn is a lake in the municipality of Åmli in Agder county, Norway.

See also
List of lakes in Norway

References

Lakes of Agder
Åmli